René Renoult (29 August 1867 in Paris – 30 April 1946 in Paris) was a French Minister and lawyer.

Renoult was the son of Étienne and Élisa Geranger, a female day laborer. He studied at the Faculty of Law in Paris and obtained his doctorate in 1888. He married for the first time with Blanche-Clothilde Wormser in 1910, and a second time with Henriette-Emelie-Céleste Giriat in 1937.

Renoult was a member of the Radical Party. His political career started in 1911, when he became General Counselor of the Lure commune (until 1913). In 1902 he became deputy for the Haute-Saône département (until 1919). From 1920 to 1941 he was Senator of Var.

Offices
1889: Chief of cabinet under Charles Floquet, president of the Chamber of Deputies.
1903: President of the Radical Party
1911–1912: Minister of Labour and Social Security Provisions
1913–1914: Minister of the Interior
1914: Minister of Finance (during 85 days).
1914: Minister of Transportation
1924–1926, 1932–1933: Minister of Justice
1926: Minister of the Marine.

References

1867 births
1946 deaths
Politicians from Paris
Radical Party (France) politicians
French Ministers of Justice
French Ministers of Labour and Social Affairs
French interior ministers
French Ministers of Finance
Transport ministers of France
Ministers of Marine
Members of the 8th Chamber of Deputies of the French Third Republic
Members of the 9th Chamber of Deputies of the French Third Republic
Members of the 10th Chamber of Deputies of the French Third Republic
Members of the 11th Chamber of Deputies of the French Third Republic
French Senators of the Third Republic
Senators of Var (department)
19th-century French lawyers
French Resistance members